Oscar Wester (born 21 June 1995) is a Swedish freestyle skier. He placed seventh in slopestyle at the FIS Freestyle World Ski Championships 2013. He represented Sweden in slopestyle at the 2014 Winter Olympics in Sochi and 2018 Winter Olympics in PyeongChang. His brother, Jacob Wester, also represents Sweden in skiing.

References

External links

1995 births
Living people
Freestyle skiers at the 2014 Winter Olympics
Freestyle skiers at the 2018 Winter Olympics
Swedish male freestyle skiers
Olympic freestyle skiers of Sweden
21st-century Swedish people